John Rector may refer to:

 John B. Rector, American federal judge
 John Rector (writer), American short story writer and novelist